Type 87 was a class of U-boats built during World War I by the Kaiserliche Marine.

Type 87 U-boats carried 16 torpedoes and had various arrangements of deck guns. U 87 and U 89 had one 10.5 cm/45 and one 8.8 cm deck gun, U 88 was probably equally armed. U 90 - U 92 were armed with one 10.5 cm/45 gun (140-240 rounds).

Many arrangements from the Type 81, 87, and 93 were also seen on the World War II Type IX U-boats when their design work took place 20 years later.

Compared to the previous type 81, the 87s were  shorter, while the pressure hull was shortened . They carried 16 torpedoes instead of 12. As with the previous type, there was a mixture of guns. Crew size was increased by 1 to 36.

Compared to the following type 93, the 87s were  shorter, with the pressure hull  shorter and 105 tons lighter. Their range was  longer, but speed was  slower on the surface and unchanged submerged.

Type 87 boats were responsible for sinking 2.218% of all allied shipping sunk during the war, taking a total of 284,961 combined tons. They also damaged 36,595 combined tons.

References

Bibliography

External links 
 

Submarine classes
World War I submarines of Germany
German Type U 87 submarines